Dearing House may refer to:

Dearing House (Newark, Arkansas), listed on the NRHP in Arkansas
Albin P. Dearing House, Athens, GA, listed on the NRHP in Georgia